The 1915 Washington State football team represented Washington State College during the 1915 college football season as an independent. The offense scored 204 points while the defense allowed only ten points, with five shutouts. Led by head coach William Dietz, the team won all seven games, including the Rose Bowl on New Year's Day in Pasadena, California.

For the first of two consecutive years, Washington State did not play in-state rival Washington.

In 2014, Washington State Senate Resolution 8715 recognized the 1915 Washington State College football team as national champions. The resolution on the team's 99th anniversary was sponsored by State Senator Michael Baumgartner, an alumnus of WSU. The senate resolution was adopted with WSU head football coach Mike Leach in attendance.

Schedule

References

External links
Official Rose Bowl game program: W.S.C. vs. Brown – January 1, 1916

Washington State
Washington State Cougars football seasons
Rose Bowl champion seasons
College football undefeated seasons
Washington State football